Monarga is a small village in the Famagusta District of Cyprus, located 7 km northeast of Trikomo. It is under the de facto control of Northern Cyprus.

References

Communities in Famagusta District
Populated places in İskele District